Around the World in 80 Days is a platform video game developed by Pick Up & Play for Mobile phones, and Published by Saffire & Disney Interactive for Game Boy Advance, It is based on Walt Disney Pictures and Walden Media's 2004 film of the same name starring Jackie Chan. The game features pre-rendered characters and graphics, and a password feature for returning to specific levels.

Like the film, the game set in the 19th century, and the player assumes the role of Passepartout (portrayed by Jackie Chan), a Chinese valet hired by an eccentric inventor Phileas Fogg (Steve Coogan) in efforts to circumnavigate the world in 80 days.

Gameplay

Around the World in 80 Days is a side-scrolling action-adventure game. Set in the 19th century, it features pre-rendered sprites, and follows almost the film's storyline and most of its locations. In the game, the player controls Passepartout, a Chinese valet hired by an inventor Phileas Fogg in attempts to circumnavigate the world in 80 days. During gameplay, the player encounters various enemies along the way, including warriors sent by General Fang. There are four blue symbols scattered throughout each level; the player must collect all four of these symbols in order to advance to the next level. Collecting them also increases the length of the health bar. The health bar depletes when being attacked by enemies or traps; when emptied, one of the remaining livesdubbed as "vials" in-gameis used automatically. An extra vial is granted if the player collects 80 golden coins scattered throughout the game.

The Game Boy Advance's R, A and B buttons are used for kicking, punching and jumping, respectively. Pressing the Select button at any point will display the controls. Passepartout can perform various actions, such as sliding, jumping from wall to wall, and grabbing ledges. The player can also attack while jumping or crouching. The game uses a password function, which allows the player to return to a specific level in the game.

Development and release
A video game based on the film Around the World in 80 Days starring Jackie Chan was developed for the Game Boy Advance by Saffire, a game studio based in American Fork, Utah. It was designed by Jeremy Throckmorton, Alex Rushton and Brandon Harmon; and programmed by Hal Rushton, Deon McClung and Karren Willard. Saffire utilized a technique to render digitized sprites, as done on their video game adaptation of the 2004 film, Van Helsing. The game was announced by its publisher Hip Games in May 2004, stating that it would ship with the film's release in North America on June 22, 2004. The European version was released on October 15, 2004.

Reception

According to the review aggregation website Metacritic, the Game Boy Advance version received "generally unfavorable reviews". Marc Nix of IGN described the gameplay as "a slobberknocker" and stated that fighting with boss characters are "just slugfests, some of which may prove too difficult to brawl through for young gamers even though the rest of the game is a cakewalk."  However, Levi Buchanan of the same site said that the mobile version "isn't even close to being the worse movie game on cellphones, but it's a far shot from the best. Average to the core, and likely not worth your download dollars." Tim Ceradsky of GameZone wrote a positive review. He noted that the GBA version is "easy enough that kids will enjoy playing it", and praised its graphics, which "looks very good for the GBA".

References

Notes

2004 video games
Video game
Action-adventure games
Game Boy Advance games
Mobile games
Single-player video games
Video games based on films
Video games based on adaptations
Video games based on works by Jules Verne
Video games developed in the United States
Video games set in the 19th century
Side-scrolling video games
Saffire games
Video games set in China
Video games set in India
Video games set in London
Video games set in New York City
Video games set in Paris
Video games set in Turkey
Video games set in San Francisco